Robert Bierman (born September 29, 1960) is an American politician serving in the Minnesota House of Representatives since 2019. A member of the Minnesota Democratic–Farmer–Labor Party (DFL), Bierman represents District 56A in the southern Twin Cities metropolitan area, which includes the city of Apple Valley and parts of Dakota County, Minnesota.

Early life, education, and career
Bierman grew up in a family as one of twelve children. He attended the University of Minnesota, earning a B.A. in history. 

Bierman owns Bierman's Home Furnishings in Northfield, Minnesota, a business started by his family over 100 years ago. He previously served as president of his local Chamber of Commerce and Rotary Club.

Minnesota House of Representatives
Bierman was elected to the Minnesota House of Representatives in 2018, and has been reelected every two years since. He first ran after one-term DFL incumbent Erin Maye Quade announced she would not seek reelection to run for Lieutenant Governor of Minnesota with gubernatorial candidate Erin Murphy. Bierman earned the DFL endorsement and won a five-candidate primary election. Bierman was sworn in on January 10, 2019, two days after the beginning of his term as he was hospitalized due to an infection. In 2020, Bierman had his election results challenged, however the case was dismissed by a judge for failing to state a claim and a lack of subject-matter jurisdiction.

Bierman serves as vice chair of the Health Finance and Policy Committee, and also sits on the Climate and Energy Finance and Policy, Commerce Finance and Policy, and Ethics Committees. From 2021-22, Bierman served as vice chair of the Preventative Health Policy Division of the Health Finance and Policy Committee.

Bierman has spoken out about the opioid epidemic, and carried legislation that would make a potential merger between the Fairview and Sanford health systems require approval from the state health commissioner before going through–citing concerns it could affect health care cost and access for Minnesotans.

Electoral history

Personal life
Bierman lives in Apple Valley, Minnesota with his wife, Ellen, and has two children.

References

External links

 Official House of Representatives website
 Official campaign website

1960 births
Living people
People from Apple Valley, Minnesota
University of Minnesota alumni
Democratic Party members of the Minnesota House of Representatives
21st-century American politicians